Saaya may refer to:

 Saaya (1989 film), a Bollywood film
 Saaya (2003 film), a Bollywood horror film
 Saaya (Indian TV series), a 1998 Indian television soap opera
 Saaya (Pakistani TV series), a 2018 Pakistani horror television series
 Saaya (novel), 2014 Nepali novel
 Saaya Irie, Japanese actress and singer
 Saaya Yamabuki (山吹 沙綾), a minor character in the Japanese TV series Shugo Chara!
 Saaya Yamabuki (山吹 沙綾), a character in the series BanG Dream!
 Saaya Agata (安形 紗綾), a character in the anime and manga series Sket Dance
 Saaya Yakushiji (薬師寺 さあや), a character in the anime Hugtto! PreCure